Saint-Barthélemy is a parish municipality in the Lanaudière region of Quebec, Canada, part of the D'Autray Regional County Municipality.

Demographics 

Mother tongue:
 English as first language: 0.5%
 French as first language: 97.3%
 English and French as first language: 0%
 Other as first language: 2.2%

Education

Commission scolaire des Samares operates francophone public schools, including:
 École Dusablé

The Sir Wilfrid Laurier School Board operates anglophone public schools, including:
 Joliette Elementary School in Saint-Charles-Borromée
 Joliette High School in Joliette

See also
List of parish municipalities in Quebec

References

External links

Saint-Barthélemy - MRC d'Autray

Incorporated places in Lanaudière
Parish municipalities in Quebec